A Tale of Two Cities is a 1911 silent film produced by Vitagraph Studios, loosely based on the 1859 novel by Charles Dickens.

Release and reception
The film's three reels were respectively released on February 21, 24, and 25, 1911. Many film exhibitors at this time were hesitant to screen pictures of more than one reel, believing that audiences would not tolerate anything longer. The Moving Picture World, however, called for all three reels of A Tale of Two Cities to be screened back-to-back, which possibly inspired Vitagraph to issue its future multi-reel pictures as a single release.

According to The Moving Picture World, the staging of the first reel "is little short of sumptuous. There is shown a care in the attention to details which stamps the picture as an unusually faithful reproduction and affords opportunity for those who have read and loved Dickens in the books to see his story move before them, much, perhaps, as it moved before him during its composition." The magazine later listed A Tale of Two Cities among a group of films that adapted classic subjects, positing that these adaptations represented an upward trend of artistic quality in the film industry.

The director Rex Ingram wrote in 1922: "In 1913, when I was studying drawings and sculpture at the Yale School of Fine Arts, a motion picture play, founded upon Charles Dickens' famous story A Tale of Two Cities, came to New Haven. It followed in the wake of many cut and dried one-reel subjects, and while this picture was necessarily full of imperfections, common to all pioneer films, it marked a tremendous step ahead in the making of them...I left the theatre greatly impressed; absolutely convinced that it would be through the medium of the film play, to the production of which the laws that govern the fine arts had been applied, that a universal understanding and appreciation of art finally would be reached."

Due to the film's enormous success, Vitagraph reissued A Tale of Two Cities in 1913.

Cast

Maurice Costello as Sydney Carton
Florence Turner as Lucie Manette
John Bunny
Norma Talmadge as The Seamstress
William J. Humphrey as The Duke D'Evremonde
Florence Foley as The Woodcutter's Child
Kenneth Casey as Duke's Son
Ralph Ince
James W. Morrison as Peasant Brother
Julia Swayne Gordon
Charles Kent as Dr. Manette
Tefft Johnson
Leo Delaney as Darnay
William Shea as Jarvis Lorry
Mabel Normand
Earle Williams
Edith Storey
Lillian Walker as Peasant Sister
Helen Gardner
Dorothy Kelly
Edwin R. Phillips
Eleanor Radinoff
Anita Stewart
Lydia Yeamans Titus

Notes

References

Sources

Further reading

External links

 
 

1911 films
1910s historical drama films
American black-and-white films
American silent films
American historical drama films
Films based on A Tale of Two Cities
Vitagraph Studios films
1911 drama films
Films directed by William J. Humphrey
1910s American films
Silent American drama films
1910s English-language films